These are a list of Statutory Instruments made in the United Kingdom in the year 2019. 1409 Statutory Instruments were implemented that year.

1-100

101-200

201-999

1201-1300

1301-1400

1401-1500

1501-1518

See also

List of Acts of the Parliament of the United Kingdom, 2000–present#2019
List of Statutory Instruments of the United Kingdom, 2016
List of Statutory Instruments of the United Kingdom, 2017
List of Statutory Instruments of the United Kingdom, 2018
List of Statutory Instruments of the United Kingdom, 2020

Notes

References

Law of the United Kingdom
2019 in British law
2019 in British politics
Lists of Statutory Instruments of the United Kingdom